Albertville is a commune in the Savoie department of south-eastern France. 

Albertville may also refer to:

Places
Canada
Albertville, Quebec
Albertville, Saskatchewan

Democratic Republic of the Congo
Kalemie, formerly known as Albertville

United States
Albertville, Alabama
Albertville, Minnesota
Albertville, Wisconsin, an unincorporated community
Old Albertville, Wisconsin, an unincorporated community

Other uses 
 1992 Winter Olympics, held at Albertville, France
Winnenden school shooting, which took place in a German Realschule called Albertville